Ernesto Montenegro (1885 – 17 June 1967) was a Chilean journalist and writer associated with the Generation of 1912.

Career
Ernesto Montenegro spent much of his life in the United States, where he served as a journalist and founded a magazine named Chile.

In Chile he founded the first school of journalism (of the University of Chile) in 1952, which he also directed and worked for as a professor.

In his country he worked for the newspaper El Mercurio, and was a chronicler for several international papers, such as El Universal (Venezuela), Excélsior (Mexico), and the New York Times, Herald Tribune, and Christian Science Monitor (United States). In addition, he translated stories by American authors.

Works
 1933 Cuentos de mi tío Ventura
 1934 Puritania. Crónicas norteamericanas
 1935 La novela chilena en medio siglo
 1937 Algunos escritores modernos de Estados Unidos
 1951 De descubierta
 1968 Mis contemporáneos (posthumous)
 1968 Viento norte, viento sur (posthumous)
 El príncipe jugador
 1970 Memorias de un desmemoriado (posthumous)

Awards
 Alberdi-Sarmiento Award from the newspaper La Prensa (Argentina)
 Atenea Award (1933)

References

1885 births
1967 deaths
Chilean journalists
Chilean translators
Chilean male writers
20th-century Chilean non-fiction writers
20th-century Chilean male writers
English–Spanish translators
People from San Felipe, Chile
Academic staff of the University of Chile
20th-century translators
20th-century journalists